The God is Love Pentecostal Church (IPDA) is a Pentecostal Christian denomination in Brazil. The headquarters are in São Paulo.

History 
The Igreja Pentecostal Deus é Amor was founded in São Paulo in 1962, by Daví Martins de Miranda (or David Miranda). The spread of the IPDA and other pentecostal churches was  encouraged by economic regression, urbanization and the emergence of the informal settlements since the 1950s, where the IPDA gained most of its new followers at this time. Among the poorest, promises of "the miracle that will free them from their situation", fell on fertile grounds. By 1995 it had spread to 30 other countries, with a membership of 800,000 members in 2001 Census. As of 2003, there were 8,140 churches.

In 2004, the church inaugurated the Temple of the Glory of God in São Paulo, with an auditorium of 60,000 seats.

Beliefs 
The denomination has a Pentecostal confession of faith.

The organisation's emphasis is on divine healing, exorcism, and missionary work. Compared to other Brazilian Pentecostal churches, Deus é Amor is of a fundamentalist Christian ideology and separates itself from society. Members are forbidden from watching television or playing soccer. It is not allowed for men to wear a beard and for women to wear make-up or jewelry. Women are prohibited from cutting their hair, dyeing their hair, dyeing their nails, wearing a split skirt, short skirt, pants, denim skirt, high heels and shaving. Men are prohibited from shaving, wearing shorts, jeans, red shirts, t-shirts, hats and having a beard. Children are prohibited from playing and having toys. Members are prohibited from visiting the beach, cinema, water park, theater and amusement park. Members are prohibited from visiting other churches (as the founder claims that God is Love Pentecostal Church is the only correct church that keeps the doctrine and goes to heaven). Members are prohibited from greeting members of other churches. Members are prohibited from celebrating birthdays, and from participating in traditional festivals. Members are prohibited from playing guitar and drums (as it is considered the instruments of Satan, and the Missionary claims that the creator of these instruments is the devil himself). Church temples cannot have artificial flowers (as it is considered the devil's flowers). Members are prohibited from drinking sodas and coca cola. Members are prohibited from using the methiolate medicine (since the liquid is considered the devil's medicine, and the spatula is considered the tongue of Satan). Members are prohibited from reading magazines, newspapers, books, and riding a bicycle (as it is considered Satan's vehicle). Members are prohibited from singing hymns from other churches and using playbacks from other singers (except playbacks from the church's record company).

"Here among us are many adulterers and adulteresses, masturbators, people obsessed by sexual intercourse, thieves, vagabonds. Who of you likes television and secular music, is misguided. Those who join in today's fashions, even in miniskirts, their tummy free, walk around, are sinning heavily against God." - David Miranda

Controversies 
The IPDA has established strict control mechanisms to survey the presence of its followers. Members of the churches have to obtain "faith cards", which must be stamped each day of the week to prove their presence at the worship service and the obligatorial payment to the church. 

The organisation, together with Edir Macedo's Igreja Universal do Reino de Deus, is accused of using the acquisition of the Edificio Cines Plaza y Central cinema in Montevideo, Uruguay as a disguise to cover up money laundering.

Furthermore, the IPDA is accused to have connections to the organized crime scene of Brazil. Many former favela gang members work as priests after their conversion.

References

External links
Official Web Site - in Portuguese

Protestantism in Brazil
Christian organizations established in 1962
Pentecostal denominations established in the 20th century
Pentecostal denominations in South America
Pentecostal churches in Brazil
Christian fundamentalism
Crime in Brazil